Ksenia Goryacheva (born 16 May 1996, Aromashevo, Tyumen Oblast) is a Russian political figure and a deputy of the 8th State Duma.
 
After graduating from the Plekhanov Russian University of Economics, Goryacheva worked as a junior manager for regional development at the Charitable Foundation for Support of Educational Programs CAPITANY. In April 2021, she was appointed secretary of the Saint-Petersburg branch of the New People. Since September 2021, she has served as deputy of the 8th State Duma.

References
 

 

1996 births
Living people
New People politicians
21st-century Russian politicians
Eighth convocation members of the State Duma (Russian Federation)
People from Tyumen Oblast
21st-century Russian women politicians
Plekhanov Russian University of Economics alumni